Gatpuno Antonio J. Villegas Cultural Award is an annual event created by the Metro Manila Film Festival in honor of former mayor (gatpuno) Antonio Villegas. It awards lifetime achievement awards to films in the annual film festivals, and that portrays Philippine culture and Filipino people to the world.

History

Antonio Villegas, the Manila mayor during his time, created the Manila Film Festival, the father of the Metro Manila Film Festival and all other Philippine festivals. He appointed Attorney Expiridion Laxa to serve as the Chairman of the film festival which starts on June 14 and culminates on June 24, Manila's birthday. In addition, in an effort to promote Philippine films, Antonio Villegas banned the showing of foreign films at movie houses during the Manila Film Festival from June 14 through June 24. Furthermore, in order to instill national pride and prevent vagrants from sleeping in movie theaters, Villegas started the tradition of playing the national anthem at the beginning of each film showings. Despite criticism from smokers and cigarette manufacturers, Villegas was adamant in banning smoking from movie theaters. In that effort, he delivered his poetic verse which is displayed on movie screens right after the national anthem. It reads: "Hindi po nais namin kayo'ng pigilin, pero ang usok ay masamang hangin." This translates to "Not that we wish to restrain you, but smoke is foul air (stench)."

Most of the first batch of the festival films came up with English titles. The best films of Manila Film Festival included "Daigdig ng mga Api' (1966), "Dahil sa Isang Bulaklak" (1967), "Manila, Open City" (1968), "Patria Adorada" (1969), "Dimasalang" (1970), "Cadena de Amor" (1971), "Elias, Basilio at Sisa" (1972), "Nueva Vizaya" (1973), "Alaala mo Daigdig Ko" (1974). From 1975 to 1990, Manila Film Festival was discontinued as Metro Manila Film Festival took over.

Years after his death in 1984, a special award in the Metro Manila Film Festival bearing his name, the Gatpuno Antonio J. Villegas Cultural Award, was created in his honor and is given to the best film that best portrays Philippine culture and Filipino people to the world. MRN Film International's Andrea, Paano Ba ang Maging Isang Ina? was the first one to receive the lifetime achievement award in 1990.

Special Award winners

1990s

2000s

2010s

2020s

Notes

References

External links
IMDB: Metro Manila Film Festival
Official website of the Metro Manila Film Festival

Metro Manila Film Festival Awards
Awards established in 1990
1990 establishments in the Philippines